Qianxian railway station is a railway station in Qian County, Xianyang, Shaanxi, China. It is an intermediate stop on the Xi'an–Pingliang railway and the Yinchuan–Xi'an high-speed railway.

Passenger service was introduced on 10 April 2015.

References 

Railway stations in Shaanxi